The 1976–77 season was Kilmarnock's 75th in Scottish League Competitions. They finished bottom of the table and were relegated at the end of the season.

Scottish Premier Division

Scottish League Cup

Group stage

Group 2 final table

Scottish Cup

Anglo-Scottish Cup

See also
List of Kilmarnock F.C. seasons

References

External links
Kilmarnock Results For Season 1873/1874

Kilmarnock F.C. seasons
Kilmarnock